Alain Anen (born 24 May 1950) is a Luxembourgian fencer. He competed in the individual and team épée events at the 1972 Summer Olympics.

References

External links
 

1950 births
Living people
People from Differdange
Luxembourgian male épée fencers
Olympic fencers of Luxembourg
Fencers at the 1972 Summer Olympics